Anthroleucosomatidae is a family of millipedes in the order Chordeumatida. These millipedes range from 3.5 mm to 28 mm in length. Adult millipedes in this family have 26, 28, 30, or 31 segments (counting the collum as the first segment and the telson as the last). This family includes Metamastigophorophyllon martensi, notable as the only chordeumatidan species with 31 segments. There are about 38 genera in Anthroleucosomatidae.

Genera
These 38 genera belong to the family Anthroleucosomatidae:

 Acanthophorella Antic & Makarov, 2016
 Adshardicus Golovatch, 1981
 Alloiopus Attems, 1951
 Alpinella Antic & Makarov, 2016
 Anamastigona Silvestri, 1898
 Anthroleucosoma Verhoeff, 1899
 Banatosoma Curcic & Makarov, 2000
 Belbogosoma Curcic & Makarov, 2008
 Brachychaetosoma Antic & Makarov, 2016
 Bulgardicus Strasser, 1960
 Bulgarosoma Verhoeff, 1926
 Caucaseuma Strasser, 1970
 Caucasominorus Antic & Makarov, 2016
 Cornogonopus Antic, 2020
 Cryptacanthophorella Antic & Makarov, 2016
 Dacosoma Tabacaru, 1967
 Dazbogosoma Makarov & Curcic, 2012
 Dentatosoma Antic & Makarov, 2016
 Enghoffiella Antic & Makarov, 2016
 Flagellophorella Antic & Makarov, 2016
 Georgiosoma Antic & Makarov, 2016
 Ghilarovia Gulicka, 1972
 Golovatchosoma Antic & Makarov, 2016
 Herculina Antic & Makarov, 2016
 Heterocaucaseuma Antic & Makarov, 2016
 Krueperia Verhoeff, 1900
 Leschius Shear & Leonard, 2004
 Metamastigophorophyllon Ceuca, 1976
 Paranotosoma Antic & Makarov, 2016
 Perunosoma Curcic & Makarov, 2007
 Pseudoflagellophorella Antic & Makarov, 2016
 Ratcheuma Golovatch, 1985
 Rhodoposoma Curcic & Makarov, 2000
 Serbosoma Curcic & Makarov, 2000
 Stygiosoma Gulicka, 1967
 Svarogosoma Makarov, 2003
 Troglodicus Gulicka, 1967
 Vegrandosoma Antic & Makarov, 2016

References

Chordeumatida
Millipede families